Hassi R'Mel Airport , also known as Tilrhemt Airport or Tilrempt Airport is an airport serving Hassi R'Mel, a town in the Laghouat Province of Algeria.

Airlines and destinations

References

External links 
 
 

Airports in Algeria
Buildings and structures in Laghouat Province